The IRENA Group is a platform company in China's sports industry. The company also known for its brand iRENA.

Company
Founded in 2001, the IRENA Group provides venue operation, sports events operation, copyrights trading, tickets services, mobile game services, fan club services and franchising of sports events.

In 2016 the company participated in a private equity fund based in Changxing as general partner and "deferred-class" limited partner for a combined , while a subsidiary of China Orient Asset Management, subscribed  as limited partner.

Sponsored events
Chinese Super League
China Basketball Association
NBA China Game
Asian Women's Volleyball Championship

Operating Venues
Beijing Worker's Stadium 
Hongkou Football Stadium 
Tianjin Olympic Center Stadium 
Helong Stadium

References

External links
 Official website

Service companies of China
Chinese companies established in 2001
Companies listed on the National Equities Exchange and Quotations